Matthew Keating  is the name of:

 Matt Keating (born 1986), Australian rugby league player
 Matt Keating (musician), American musician
 Matthew Keating (politician) (1869–1937), Irish politician, Member of Parliament 1909–1918